Adams Covered Bridge is a  historic covered bridge in Morgan County, Ohio spanning San Toy Creek near Malta.  The bridge was built in 1875 using a "multiple kingpost truss" design.  It is no longer used for traffic.  It has also been known as the San Toy Bridge and as the '''Adams - San Toy Covered Bridge.

It was listed in the National Register in 1999.

References 

Covered bridges on the National Register of Historic Places in Ohio
Bridges completed in 1875
Wooden bridges in Ohio
Buildings and structures in Morgan County, Ohio
National Register of Historic Places in Morgan County, Ohio
Transportation in Morgan County, Ohio
1875 establishments in Ohio
Road bridges on the National Register of Historic Places in Ohio